Lajwanti is a 1958 Indian drama film directed by Narendra Suri. It was entered into the 1959 Cannes Film Festival, where it was nominated for the Palme d'Or for Best Film. The film was remade in Tamil as Engal Selvi (1960).

Cast
 Balraj Sahni as Nirmal Kumar
 Nargis as Mrs. Kavita Kumar
 Naaz as Renu 
 Radhakrishan as Pyare Mohan 
 Manorama as Mrs. Godavari
 Mumtaz Begum as Jamna
 Leela Mishra as Nirmal's Sister

Soundtrack

Awards
National Film Awards
 1959 - National Film Award for Best Feature Film in Hindi - Certificate of Merit

References

External links
 

1958 films
1950s Hindi-language films
1958 drama films
Indian black-and-white films
Films scored by S. D. Burman
Indian drama films
Hindi films remade in other languages
Hindi-language drama films